Matthew Kellway (born December 10, 1964) is a Canadian economist and former politician. He was a New Democratic Member of Parliament for the Toronto riding of Beaches—East York from 2011 to 2015. In the 2018 municipal election he came in second in Ward 19 for the Toronto City Council.

Background
Kellway spent much of his childhood in Kingston. He has a degree in political science from Queen's University, and a Master of Industrial Relations degree from the University of Toronto. He also pursued graduate studies at York University.

He worked as an economist and as a policy analyst with the Society of Energy Professionals. He was co-chair of the Toronto Energy Coalition, and chair of the St. John Catholic School Parent Council. He served as president of the Beaches-East York NDP Riding Association for four terms.

Kellway is married to Donna, who is a crown attorney. They have three children and live in the Beaches neighbourhood.

Since February 2016, he has worked for the Society of Energy Professionals, a Toronto-based local of the International Federation of Professional & Technical Engineers labour union, where he is special assistant to the president and manager, central functions.

Politics

Federal
In the 2011 federal election he ran as the New Democratic candidate in the riding of Beaches—East York. He defeated longtime Liberal incumbent Maria Minna by 5,309 votes. He served as the opposition critic for urban affairs and infrastructure, as well as deputy critic for transport. In 2015 he was defeated by Liberal candidate Nathaniel Erskine-Smith during an election where the Liberals took every seat in Toronto. He was defeated by over 10,000 votes.

Municipal
Initially Kellway registered to run in the 2018 municipal election in ward 37.  However, after the provincial government reduced the number of wards from 47 to 25 he reregistered to run in ward 19 which conforms to the boundaries of his former federal riding of Beaches-East York. Kellway was endorsed by outgoing councillor Janet Davis, but lost the election to Brad Bradford.

Electoral record

References

External links

1964 births
21st-century Canadian politicians
Living people
Members of the House of Commons of Canada from Ontario
New Democratic Party MPs
Politicians from Gatineau
Politicians from Toronto
Queen's University at Kingston alumni
University of Toronto alumni
York University alumni